Michiel Gardeyn, initially called K 1, was a  of the Dutch Koninklijke Marine. She was decommissioned in 1921.

Service history
Michiel Gardeyn was commissioned in to the Koninklijke Marine in 1905.

References

K-class torpedo boats
Ships built in Schiedam
1905 ships